Ahmed Eid (born 30 October 1960) is an Egyptian swimmer. He competed in two events at the 1984 Summer Olympics.

References

External links
 

1960 births
Living people
Egyptian male swimmers
Olympic swimmers of Egypt
Swimmers at the 1984 Summer Olympics
Place of birth missing (living people)
African Games medalists in swimming
African Games bronze medalists for Egypt
Competitors at the 1978 All-Africa Games